The city of Lawrenceburg is the county seat of Lawrence County, Tennessee, United States,  The largest city on the state's southern border between Chattanooga and Memphis, it lies on the banks of Shoal Creek.  The population was 11,633 at the 2020 United States Census.  The city is named after War of 1812 American Navy officer James Lawrence.

History
According to a recent theory, the Lawrenceburg area is the likely site of "Chicasa"—the place where Spanish explorer Hernando de Soto and his men wintered in 1540–41 (though earlier theories have suggested this campsite to have been in northern Mississippi). The Chickasaw Nation sold the area to the US in 1816.

Upon moving from East Tennessee into the region around 1817, David Crockett served as a justice of the peace, a colonel of the militia, and a state representative. David Crockett established a powder mill on Shoal Creek originally called the Sycamore River. This area is now home to David Crockett State Park. Crockett was elected as a commissioner and served on the board that placed Lawrenceburg four miles (6 km) west of the geographic center of Lawrence County. Crockett was opposed to the city being located in its current location, largely out of fear of flooding. He and his family lived in Lawrenceburg for several years before moving to West Tennessee after a flood destroyed his mill.

After World War II, the Murray Ohio Manufacturing Company, a U.S. producer of bicycles and outdoor equipment, moved its manufacturing operations to Lawrenceburg, building a new factory and assembly plant. Over the next several decades, the Murray factory grew to be one of the largest in the United States:  under roof.

A flood struck Lawrenceburg in July 1998, killing two people on Shoal Creek.

Following the flood, the city undertook a 10-year flood control project that dramatically reduced risk for major flooding that had plagued the town since the days of Davy Crockett.

Geography
Lawrenceburg is located at  (35.243491, −87.334563).

It is the largest city on the state line between Chattanooga and Memphis.
Map of the Appalachian Mountain Range.

Climate

Demographics

2020 census

As of the 2020 United States census, there were 11,633 people, 4,535 households, and 2,489 families residing in the city.

2010 census
As of the census of 2010, there were 10,428 people living in the city. The population density was 857.6 people per square mile (331.1/km). There were 5,166 housing units at an average density of 410.4 per square mile (158.4/km). The racial makeup of the city was 94% White, 2.6% Black or African American, 0.3% American Indian and Alaska Native, 0.4% Asian, 0.0% Native Hawaiian and Other Pacific Islander, 0.6% from Some Other Race, and 2.1% from Two or More Races. Hispanic or Latino people represented 2% of the population.

There were 4,579 households, out of which 24.8% had children under the age of 18 living with them, 39% were a husband-wife family living together, 15% had a female householder with no husband present, 4.8% had a male householder with no wife present, and 41.1% were nonfamily households. 36.4% of nonfamily households were made up of a householder living alone, and 18.1% of nonfamily households consisted of a person living alone who was 65 years of age or older. The average household size was 2.23, and the average family size was 2.89.

The median age of a person in Lawrenceburg during the 2010 United States Census was 40.8 years. The population was 53.4% female and 46.6% male.

The median income for a household in the city was $36,286, and the median income for a family was $47,143. Median earnings for male full-time, year-round workers was $34,960 versus $26,188 for female full-time, year-round workers. The per capita income for the city was $20,587. About 12.6% of families and 18.8% of the population were below the poverty line, including 28.5% of those under age 18 and 13.9% of those age 65 or over.

Culture
Tourist attractions include David Crockett State Park and Amish Country.

Lawrence County is the birthplace of Southern Gospel Music and visitors to historic downtown Lawrenceburg can see where it all began at the James D. Vaughan Museum on the Square.

The downtown area has a statue of David "Davy" Crockett, a replica of Crockett's office, and one of the only two Mexican–American War monuments in the U.S.

Major annual events

Education
The city is home to five elementary schools, one middle school, and one high school, as well as a satellite campus of Columbia State Community College. Lawrenceburg is also home to the Southern Tennessee Higher Education Center. The local school district also operates an adult secondary educational facility and a specialized achievement school for K-12 students within the city's borders.

High schools

· Lawrence County High School

Middle schools

· E.O. Coffman Middle School

Elementary schools
· Ingram Sowell Elementary School

· David Crockett Elementary School

· New Prospect Elementary School

· Lawrenceburg Public Elementary School

· Sacred Heart Elementary School

Radio broadcasting
 WDXE "AM 1370 FM 105.3 The Legend WDXE"
 WLFM "K-Love"
 WLLX "The TN Valley's Superstation 97.5 / 98.3 WLX"

Television broadcasting
 Tennessee Valley Weather

Notable people
 Davy Crockett for a time called Lawrenceburg home. Many landmarks and businesses now include Crockett in their names. David Crockett State Park on the western edge of the city and the David Crockett Monument located on the city square are two spots that pay homage to the legendary outdoorsman.
 Michael Jeter (1952-2003), Tony Award-winning actor for Grand Hotel, also had a memorable film role in The Green Mile, played Mister Noodle on Sesame Street; born in Lawrenceburg.
 James Daniel Niedergeses, bishop of the Roman Catholic Diocese of Nashville
 Adger M. Pace (1882-1959), Southern gospel hymn writer
 Ingram C. Sowell (1892-1947), rear admiral, US Navy, and recipient of the Navy Cross
 Fred Dalton Thompson (1942-2015), lawyer, U.S. senator, actor, and Law & Order cast-member; sought the GOP nomination for president in the 2008 campaign
 James David Vaughan, credited as the father of Southern gospel music and founder of the Vaughan Publishing Company in downtown Lawrenceburg
 William Burton Walbert (1886-1959), Southern gospel singer-songwriter
 David Weathers, former pitcher for the Cincinnati Reds; father of Ryan Weathers
 Ryan Weathers, professional baseball pitcher in the San Diego Padres organization

References

External links
 City of Lawrenceburg Government

Cities in Tennessee
Cities in Lawrence County, Tennessee
County seats in Tennessee
Davy Crockett